Crawford Township, Kansas may refer to:

 Crawford Township, Cherokee County, Kansas
 Crawford Township, Crawford County, Kansas

See also 
 List of Kansas townships
 Crawford Township (disambiguation)

Kansas township disambiguation pages